Holy Cross Regional High School, or "HCRHS", is a Catholic school, under the administration of CISVA (Catholic Independent Schools of the Vancouver Archdiocese) school board located in Surrey, British Columbia, Canada.

Robert Dejulius (March 12, 1943) served 28 years as principal since the high school opened in 1982 and retired at the end of school season in 2010. Chris Blesch is the current principal. Stanley Kazun has also served as vice principal since the opening in 1982. Ex-BC Lions linebacker Glen Jackson retired as a social studies, business ed, and athletics teacher.

Independent school status
Holy Cross Regional High School is classified as a Group 1 school under British Columbia's Independent School Act. It receives 50% funding from the Ministry of Education. The school receives religious donations. It is under charge of the Roman Catholic Archdiocese of Vancouver.

School uniforms
The uniform is an important part of Holy Cross Regional High School standards as it seeks to promote unity in faith. It also helps to remove discrimination. Students are expected to wear their uniform to, from and at school.  The uniform includes grey pants for boys, kilts for girls, black cardigan for both and polo and oxford shirts for both along with all black shoes.

Departments

Academics
Holy Cross was ranked by the Fraser Institute in 2014 as 43 out of 289 British Columbian Secondary Schools. In 2008, 100% of the students graduated and 85%+ of those students went on to study at colleges and universities.

The academic departments are Business Education, Drama, English, Food, Information Communication Technology,  Languages, Math, Music, Physical Education, Religion,  Sciences, Social Studies, and Visual Arts.

Athletics
Athletic programs offered in Holy Cross include Basketball, Volleyball, Track and Field, Soccer, Cross Country, Swimming, Golf, Football, Tennis, Cheerleading, Ultimate Frisbee, and Dance Squad.

Sports events are held at Holy Cross like the BC Catholic Basketball Championship, rated the BC's best sporting atmosphere, which features rivalries between all BC Catholic high schools. The basketball program is consistently ranked in the top 10 in both boys and girls and has placed provincially countless times in volleyball, track, basketball and football.

Holy Cross's facilities include a full-sized wood floor gymnasium, a track oval, and a football and soccer field. The track oval is open for public use when school is not in session.

Music
The school has a Juno award-winning music program that includes three concert bands (Senior Wind Ensemble, Junior Wind Ensemble, and Grade 8 Concert Band) as well as choral groups (Senior Concert Choir: ViBE and Junior Concert Choir: ToNiC!). The Holy Cross Music Program also have Jazz programs in the school like jazz bands (Jazz One, and Jazz-Do-It) and jazz choir (Avenue 88). Each music groups compete in known music festivals such as the Kiwanis Music Festival, Cantando Music Festival, and Surrey (Envision) Jazz Festival. Holy Cross also has Combos (Combo 217 and Grade 8 Combo).

Advanced Placement
Current Advanced Placement Class that is offered in Holy Cross is Physics.

Extracurricular activities
Holy Cross offers many clubs including:

JEL Club
Student Leadership Team
Yearbook 
Campus Ministry
Music Student Leadership
Athletic Media Leadership
WebTeam (Audio Visual Club)
Chess Club
Business club

Many Holy Cross senior students take part in a biannual Mission Trip where they work in underprivileged communities.

Religious education
Holy Cross provides mandatory religious education. The course curriculum is organized by the Roman Catholic Archdiocese of Vancouver.

Current plans 
Work is underway to replace the original 1982 school building in its entirety. The short-term plan involves building an additional school building while the long-term plan (projected to take 10 to 15 years) involves the outright replacement of the existing school with another new building.

Notable alumni
Jean-Luc Bilodeau – Actor
Elise Estrada – Singer
Emmalyn Estrada – Singer
Dario Zanatta – Soccer player<ref
name="Bio"></ref>
Jonathan Kongbo – 2019 Grey Cup Champion for the Winnipeg Blue Bombers and former 2019 CFL first-round pick
Zach Verhoven – Soccer midfielder for Atlético Ottawa of the Canadian Premier League

References

External links
Holy Cross High School
 Catholic Independent Schools of the Vancouver Archdiocese
 The Fraser Institute School Performance Report Cards
 BC High School Football

High schools in Surrey, British Columbia
Educational institutions established in 1982
Private schools in British Columbia
Catholic secondary schools in British Columbia
1982 establishments in British Columbia